Events in the year 1939 in Japan. It corresponds to Shōwa 15 (昭和15年) in the Japanese calendar.

Incumbents
Emperor: Hirohito
Prime Minister: Fumimaro Konoe until January 5, then Nobuyuki Abe

Governors
Aichi Prefecture: Kotaro Tanaka
Akita Prefecture: Kaoru Sasaki (until 11 January); Yukio Tomeoka (starting 11 January)
Aomori Prefecture: Masanori Ogawa (until 1 March); Noburo Suzuki (starting 1 March) 
Ehime Prefecture: Shizuo Furukawa (until 15 July); Yoshio Mochinaga (starting 15 July)
Fukui Prefecture: Nakano Yoshiro (until 14 April); Kiyoshi Kimura (starting 14 April)
Fukuoka Prefecture: Kyuichi Kodama (starting 1940)
Fukushima Prefecture: Seikichi Kimishima (until 5 September); Seikichi Hashimoto (starting 5 September)
Gifu Prefecture: Miyano Shozo
Gunma Prefecture: Shozo Tsuchiya (until 17 April); Kumano Ei (starting 17 April)
Hiroshima Prefecture: Ichisho Inuma (until 5 September); Katsuroku Aikawa (starting 5 September)
Ibaraki Prefecture: Shigeru Hamaza (until 11 January); Tokitsugi Yoshinaga (starting 11 January)
Ishikawa Prefecture: Masasuke Kodama then Narita Ichiro 
Iwate Prefecture: Chiyoji Yukizawa 
Kagawa Prefecture: Nagatoshi Fujioka 
Kanagawa Prefecture: Seiichi Ōmura then Ichisho Inuma 
Kumamoto Prefecture: Tomoichi Koyama
Kochi Prefecture: Fujioka Nagawa (until 17 April); Shunsuke Kondo (starting 17 April)
Kyoto Prefecture: Tota Akamatsuko 
Mie Prefecture: Masatoshi Sato (until 3 January); Masanari Ogawa (starting 1 March)
Miyagi Prefecture: Ryosaku Shimizu 
Miyazaki Prefecture: 
 until 12 April: Jiro Ino 
 12 April-7 September: Kyuichiro Totsuka
 starting 7 September: Ryosaku Shimizu
Nagano Prefecture: Tomita Kenji 
Nagasaki Prefecture: Jitsuzo Kawanishi 
Niigata Prefecture: Yasujiro Nakamura (until 5 September); Seikichi Kimishima (starting 5 September)
Okinawa Prefecture: Fusataro Fuchigami
Saga Prefecture: Tomoichi Koyama (until 17 April); Kato (starting 17 April)
Saitama Prefecture: Toki Ginjiro
Shiname Prefecture: Kyuichi Kodama (until 9 April); ... (starting 9 April)
Tochigi Prefecture: Adachi Shuuritsu 
Tokyo: Okada Shuzo
Toyama Prefecture: Kenzo Yano
Yamagata Prefecture: Takei Yoshitsugu (until 17 April); Ishiguro Takeshige (starting 17 April)

Events
February - Hainan Island Operation
March - Battle of Xiushui River
March 1 – According to Japanese government official confirmed report, Japanese Imperial Army ammunition dump explode in Hirakata, Osaka Prefecture, 94 persons were human fatalities, 602 persons were hurt.
March 17-May 9 - Battle of Nanchang
April 20-May 24 - Battle of Suixian–Zaoyang
May 11-September 16 - Battles of Khalkhin Gol
June - Swatow Operation
June 1 –Nippon Electric Works and Showa Fertilizer were merger, becomes name was Showa Denko.
September 13-October 8 - Battle of Changsha (1939)
Unknown date – Mukogawa Higher Women's School was founded, as predecessor of Mukogawa Women's University.

Births
February 9 – Tadahiro Matsushita, politician (d. 2012)
February 17 – Toshihiro Nikai, politician
March 2 – Takako, Princess Suga, youngest child of Emperor Shōwa
April 9 – Ikuko Tani, actress, voice actress and narrator
August 13 – Shijaku Katsura, rakugo performer (d. 1999) 
September 22 – Junko Tabei, mountaineer, first woman to reach the summit of Mount Everest (d. 2016)

Deaths
February 18 – Kanoko Okamoto, author, poet, and Buddhist scholar (b. 1889)
March 29 – Michizō Tachihara, poet and architect (b. 1914)
September 7 – Kyōka Izumi, novelist and Kabuki playwright  (b. 1873)
November 11 – Kagaku Murakami, painter and illustrator (b. 1888)
December 25 – Masao Nakamura, major general (b. 1892)

See also
 List of Japanese films of the 1930s

References

 
1930s in Japan
Japan